Royrader is an unincorporated community in Jackson County, in the U.S. state of Kentucky. A post office called Royrader was established in 1927, and remained in operation until 1969. The community derives its name from Roy Rader, a businessperson in the local lumber industry. The community is along Kentucky Route 578 approximately 4 miles south of Annville, Kentucky, the county's largest community.

References

Unincorporated communities in Jackson County, Kentucky
Unincorporated communities in Kentucky